Longfield Academy is an academy school in Longfield, Kent, England. The academy is operated by Leigh Academies Trust and occupies the site where Longfield Comprehensive and Axton Chase School used to be. Longfield Academy moved into new buildings in July 2011 and has 877 pupils.

History 
Longfield Academy occupies part of the former site of Axton Chase School, which closed in 2010. The academy was rebuilt at a different location on the former site, the old buildings were demolished and re-developed as housing.

Structure 
Longfield Academy is part of Leigh Academies Trust. The Trust also includes 22 other academies. All of the Academies share one governing body, and are led by a chief executive officer based at the Trust offices.

Electronic learning 
The academy aims to provide students with new ways to learn and reach their potential. The academy offers an iPad scheme for use in their everyday education.

References

External links 
 Ofsted reports

Secondary schools in Kent
Academies in Kent
Leigh Academies Trust